Kambarka is a town and the administrative center of Kambarsky District of the Udmurt Republic, Russia, located on the Kambarka River (Kama's basin),  southeast of Izhevsk. Population:

History
It was founded as a settlement around a Demidov ironworks, which was constructed in 1761–1767. It was granted town status in 1945.

The city of Kambarka was one of the residence centers of the Udmurt Jews.

Administrative and municipal status
Within the framework of administrative divisions, Kambarka serves as the administrative center of Kambarsky District. As an administrative division, it is incorporated within Kambarsky District as the town of district significance of Kambarka. As a municipal division, the town of district significance of Kambarka is incorporated within Kambarsky Municipal District as Kambarskoye Urban Settlement.

Economy
Kambarka Engineering Works operates in the town. Operates a chemical plant.

Chemical weapons destruction plant
A chemical weapons destruction plant was built in Kambarka during the Soviet times. This was in accordance to the obligations under the CWC to destroy all of the chemical weapon stockpiles by 2012.

International relations

Twin towns and sister cities
On May 17, 2002, Mayor Georgy Kislov signed a Sister Cities International agreement with Mayor Charlie Roberts of the city of Tooele, Utah in the United States.

References

Notes

Sources

External links

Official website of Kambarka 
Kambarka Business Directory 

Cities and towns in Udmurtia
Osinsky Uyezd